Mir Alam was a nobleman who served as Prime Minister of Hyderabad State from 1804 until his death in 1808. He belonged to the Salar Jung family. He was the grandfather of Salar Jung I.

The Mir Alam tank is named after him.

He died of leprosy, in Hyderabad.

References 

People from Hyderabad State
1808 deaths
Prime Ministers of Hyderabad State